The ruins of the Pajrek Castle lie in the Czech Republic above the town of Nýrsko in the western part of the Bohemian Forest at a height of 505 metres above sea level.

This important border castle was built at the beginning of the 14th century, but by 1472 it had already been abandoned. In 1504, the castle was rebuilt, but it was only used until the middle of the 16th century, when it was finally abandoned. Only the remains of the huge tower have survived.

Gallery 

Ruined castles in the Czech Republic
Castles in the Plzeň Region
Bohemian Forest